Dhiraj Vilasrao Deshmukh (born 6 April 1980) is an Indian politician and an MLA of Indian National Congress, and son of Vilasrao Deshmukh. He was elected from the Latur Rural (Vidhan Sabha constituency) to the Maharashtra Legislative Assembly in 2019 as a member of the Indian National Congress. He won by a margin of 121482 which is third largest in terms of votes in 2019 Maharashtra Legislative Assembly election.

Early life
He was born as third & youngest son of Vilasrao Deshmukh. He's also the younger brother of Minister Amit Deshmukh & actor Riteish Deshmukh.

Political career
 District President- Indian Youth Congress
 2017-2019: Member, Latur Zilla Parishad
 2019-Present: Member of Maharashtra Legislative Assembly

Personal life
He is married to Deepshikha Deshmukh. The couple has two children.

Positions held
 2014 : President, Youth Congress, Latur District
 2017-2019: Member, Latur Zilla Parishad
 2019-Present: Member of Maharashtra Legislative Assembly
 2020 : Member, Maharashtra State Wildlife Board
 2020 : Member, Marathi Language Committee of Maharashtra State Government
 2020 : Member, State Government Estimates Committee
 2020 : Member, State Government Private Hospital Inspection Committee (Charity funds)
 2021 : General Secretary, Maharashtra Pradesh Congress committee
 2021-Present : Chairman, The Latur District Central Co-Op Bank Ltd. Latur

See also
 Vilasrao Deshmukh
 Amit Deshmukh
 Latur rural constituency

References

Members of the Maharashtra Legislative Assembly
Living people
Indian National Congress politicians
Marathi politicians
People from Latur
1980 births